The South Railroad Historic District in Baconton, Georgia is a  historic district that was listed on the National Register of Historic Places in 1983.

It included seven one-story or one-and-a-half-story houses built before 1927 and a service station.

The district was one of three in Baconton listed on the National Register at the same time, as part of a review of all historic resources in Baconton, along with the George W. Jackson House.

References

Historic districts on the National Register of Historic Places in Georgia (U.S. state)
Victorian architecture in Georgia (U.S. state)
Buildings and structures completed in 1900
National Register of Historic Places in Mitchell County, Georgia